William Manning Rountree, Jr. (March 28, 1917 – November 3, 1995) was an American diplomat.

He was born in Swainsboro, Georgia to William Manning Rountree, Sr. and Clyde Branan Rountree on March 28, 1917. William Sr. died when his son, the youngest in a family of seven children, was eighteen months old. The family moved to Atlanta when William Jr. was six, where he attended high school. After graduating from high school in 1935, Rountree got a job with the United States Department of the Treasury where he held various clerical and accounting positions. He later became involved with the lend-lease program.

In 1942 he transferred to the United States Department of State and was assigned to Cairo, Egypt where he helped organize World War II aid programs. This led to a long diplomatic career in which Rountree specialized in the Middle East and South Asia. During 1948 and 1949 he was assigned to the U.S. Embassy in Athens, Greece, where he helped administer U.S. aid programs to the Greek army which was fighting Communist insurgents. He later held positions in Turkey and Iran. In 1956 he became Assistant Secretary of State for Near Eastern, South Asian and African Affairs. In this position he helped develop U.S. policy involving the Suez crisis in November 1956 and the U.S. intervention in Lebanon in 1958. Rountree served as Ambassador to Pakistan (1959–62), Sudan (1962–65), South Africa (1965–70), and Brazil (1970–73). He retired in May 1973 and settled in Gainesville, Florida, where he died of cancer on November 3, 1995.

References

External links
PDF Finding Aid of the Papers of William M. Rountree, Dwight D. Eisenhower Presidential Library

1917 births
1995 deaths
Ambassadors of the United States to Pakistan
Ambassadors of the United States to Sudan
Ambassadors of the United States to South Africa
Ambassadors of the United States to Brazil
People from Swainsboro, Georgia
People from Gainesville, Florida
Deaths from cancer in Florida